Rauza, Rouza, Roza is a Perso-Arabic term used in Middle East and Indian subcontinent which means shrine or tomb. It is also known as mazār, maqbara or dargah.

The word rauza is derived through Persian from the Arabic rawdah ( rawḍah) meaning garden, but extended to tomb surrounded by garden as at Agra and Aurangabad. Abdul Hamid Lahauri, the author of the Badshahnama, the official history of Shah Jahan's reign, calls Taj Mahal rauza-i munawwara (Perso-Arabic:  rawdah-i munawwarah), meaning the illumined or illustrious tomb in a garden.

References

Burial monuments and structures
Islamic architecture
Arabic words and phrases
Persian words and phrases
Urdu-language words and phrases
Bengali words and phrases